Abalone is a two-player abstract strategy board game designed by Michel Lalet and Laurent Lévi in 1987. Players are represented by opposing black and white marbles on a hexagonal board with the objective of pushing six of the opponent's marbles off the edge of the board.

Abalone was published in 1990 and has sold more than 4.5 million units. The year it was published it received one of the first Mensa Select awards. It is currently sold in more than thirty countries.

Gameplay

Rules 
The board consists of 61 circular spaces arranged in a hexagon, five on a side. Each player has 14 marbles that rest in the spaces and are initially arranged as shown below, on the left image. The players take turns with the black marbles moving first. For each move, a player moves a straight line of one, two or three marbles of one color one space in one of six directions. The move can be either broadside / arrow-like (parallel to the line of marbles) or in-line / in a line (serial in respect to the line of marbles), as illustrated below.

A player can push their opponent's marbles (a "sumito") that are in a line to their own with an in-line move only. They can only push if the pushing line has more marbles than the pushed line (three can push one or two; two can push one). Marbles must be pushed to an empty space (i.e. not blocked by a marble) or off the board. The winner is the first player to push six of the opponent's marbles off of the edge of the board.

Move notation 
The notation for recording moves gives the letters A-I to the horizontal lines, and the numbers 1–9 to northwest–southeast diagonals.

      I O O O O O
     H O O O O O O
    G + + O O O + +
   F + + + + + + + +
  E + + + + + + + + +
   D + + + + + + + + 9
    C + + @ @ @ + + 8
     B @ @ @ @ @ @ 7
      A @ @ @ @ @ 6
         1 2 3 4 5

One popular notation:
an inline move can be denoted by the movement of the trailing marble (the "caboose");
broadside moves can be denoted by the initial positions of the two extremities of the lance followed by the final position of the first marble (with this notation, each broadside move has two notations possible, which could be avoided).

Avoiding draws 

The dynamics of the basic game may have one serious flaw: it seems that a good but conservative player can set up their marbles in a defensive wedge and ward off all attacks indefinitely. An attacker may try to outflank this wedge or lure it into traps, but such advances are often more dangerous to the attacker than the defender. Thus, from the starting position, it takes little skill and no imagination to avoid losing, and nothing in the rules prevents games from being interminable.

Because it is boring for games to be drawn out indefinitely, serious Abalone players tacitly agree to play aggressively. A player who forms a defensive wedge and makes no attempt to attack is likely to be a novice who might lose anyway. Nevertheless, there remains the possibility of any competent player bringing the game to a standstill and successfully avoiding losing, even to a championship-level player.

There are several possible "solutions". First, in tournaments, a judge may penalize a player for playing defensively. This solution is somewhat unsatisfactory, given that a judge may not always be present, and that "defensive play" is subjective.

Second, several variations of the rules have been developed for the same board and marbles.  None of the variations has the same appealing simplicity of the original.

The third, and perhaps best, alternative starting positions have been designed to make the formation of stalemate wedges less likely.  Experiments are still underway to find an opening position which neither devolves to a draw nor gives too great an advantage to the first player. One popular attempt are the Marguerite or Daisy positions, two versions of which are displayed in the center and to the right.

Another option is to create a "turn limit" where if no marble has been knocked off the board by turn 15, whoever has made the most progress towards the center line wins. This encourages an aggressive strategy of moving forward and often the rule will not come into play.

Rule variations and more players 

Abalone can be played by three or more people using the same board with fewer marbles for each player and each player has a different colour.

A number of two-player variations use a third colour for passive pieces. For example, the variation called The Pillar (with a fixed marble in the centre of the board), which has been examined to some depth by Alex Borello and Nicolas Le Gal, uses a third colour. Another possible variation involves either player winning the game by ejecting the central marble.

A few variations use a second layer of marbles.

Strategy 
Forums of Abalone communities have found that, generally:
 Keep the marbles close to the centre of the board and force the opponent to move to the edges.
 Keep the marbles close together for increased defense and attack, especially in a hexagon shape to be able to push or defend in any direction.
 Pushing the opponent off the board is not usually a good idea if it leads to weaknesses in the player's geometry.
 Setting a "trap" by making a marble weak in one direction allows for opponent to weaken center defenses.

Champions 
Person-to-person competitions have been held by the Mind Sports Olympiad since 1997.
 1997: Marc Tastet
 1998: Vojtěch Hrabal
 1999: Gert Schnider
 2000: Gert Schnider
 2001: Thomas Fenner
 2002: Jan Šťastna
 2003: Stephane Nicolet
 2004: Alex Borello
 2005: David M. Pearce
 2006: Jan Šťastna
 2007: Vincent Frochot
 2008: Jan Šťastna
 2009: David M. Pearce
 2010: Vincent Frochot
 2011: Vincent Frochot
 2012: David M. Pearce
 2013: David M. Pearce
 2014: Nicolas Fiorini
 2015: Vincent Frochot
 2016: Vincent Frochot
 2017: Vincent Frochot
 2018: Vincent Frochot
 2019: Vincent Frochot

Gert Schnider and Thomas Fenner participated in the evaluation and adjustment of AbaPro. Marc Tastet was the 1992 World Othello Champion, Stephane Nicolet is a two-time World Othello Championship finalist, and Jan Stastna is a strong Othello player.

In a computer-to-computer competition held in 2003 at the International Computer Games Association (ICGA) events in Graz, Austria, the AbaPro program defeated the Nacre program.

In 1999, a number of top players from the Mind Sports Olympiad signed an agreement to use a different starting position (the Belgian daisy) to revitalize the game. This has been used for top tournaments since then, including the AbaCup.

Reception
In the February–March 1990 edition of Games International (Issue 13), Mike Siggins called the components "of good quality", and the rules "extremely concise." He found the game very replayable, and commented that "it has the potential to become a classic." His only complaint was that "as players become more proficient the game can slow up and stalemates often result." Despite this, Siggins gave the game an above-average rating of 8 out of 10, saying, "Abalone is one of the best abstract games to appear in a long while."

Reviews
Games
Jeux & Stratégie #54

See also 
 GIPF project, a series of games using hexagons
 DVONN
 ZÈRTZ
 YINSH

References

External links 
 

Board games introduced in 1987
Abstract strategy games
Mensa Select winners